The following outline is provided as an overview of and topical guide to biotechnology:

Biotechnology – field of applied biology that involves the use of living organisms and bioprocesses in engineering, technology, medicine and other fields requiring bioproducts. Biotechnology also utilizes these products for manufacturing purposes.

Essence of biotechnology

 Bioengineering
 Biology
 Technology

Applications of biotechnology
 Cloning
 Reproductive cloning
 Therapeutic cloning
 Environmental biotechnology
 Genetic engineering
 Recombinant DNA
 Synthetic biology
 Tissue engineering
 Use of biotechnology in pharmaceutical manufacturing

History of biotechnology

History of biotechnology
 Timeline of biotechnology
 Green Revolution

General biotechnology concepts
 Bioeconomy
 Biotechnology industrial park
 Green Revolution
 Human Genome Project
 Pharmaceutical company
 Stem cell
 Telomere
 Tissue culture
 Biomimetics

Biotechnology industry 

 List of biotechnology companies

Leaders in biotechnology
 Leonard Hayflick
 Michael D. West
 Craig Venter
 David Baltimore

See also
 Index of biotechnology articles

External links

 A report on Agricultural Biotechnology focusing on the impacts of "Green" Biotechnology with a special emphasis on economic aspects
 Building Biotechnology Glossary A glossary covering the science, legal, regulatory, and business aspects of biotechnology
 StandardGlossary.com: Biotechnology A professional Biotechnology Glossary for beginners to learn Biotechnology

Biotechnology
Biotechnology